Ilvana Zvizdić (born January 14, 1971 in Sarajevo) is a former Yugoslav and Bosnian female basketball player.

External links
Profile at eurobasket.com

1971 births
Living people
Basketball players from Sarajevo
Bosnia and Herzegovina women's basketball players
Yugoslav women's basketball players
Small forwards
Power forwards (basketball)
ŽKK Partizan players
ŽKK Željezničar Sarajevo players